The Moribund People is a 2005 EP by the avant-garde metal project Peccatum and their last release before they split up in 2006. On this EP, Peccatum's style hovers between black metal, modern classical and electronica.

It features the title track, another song called "A Penny's Worth Of Heart" and a cover of the song "For All Those Who Died", from the Bathory album Blood Fire Death. The EP also features the music video for the track "The Moribund People", Peccatum's first and only music video, in QuickTime format.

Track listing
"The Moribund People" – 4:26
"A Penny's Worth of Heart" – 4:52
"For All Those Who Died" (Bathory cover) – 5:51
+ The Moribund People [*Video]

Credits
Ihsahn: Vocals, Keyboards, Strings
Ihriel: Vocals, Keyboards
Jarle Havrås: Drums

Peccatum albums
2005 EPs